Mbeere South is an electoral constituency in Embu County, Kenya. It used to be known as Gachoka Constituency, one of two constituencies of the former Mbeere District. It has five wards; Mwea, Makima, Mbeti South, Mavuria and Kiambere Wards. The constituency was established for the 1988 elections.

The constituency's  Member of Parliament is Hon. Col (Rtd) Geoffrey King'ang'i, who has been serving since the 2017 General Election. Hon. King'ang'i retired from the military to join politics and run against Mutava Musyimi.

Members of Parliament

Locations and wards

References 

Constituencies in Eastern Province (Kenya)
1988 establishments in Kenya
Constituencies established in 1988
Constituencies in Embu County